Programmation Automatique des Formules is a programming language designed in 1957-1959 by Dimitri Starynkevitch at SEA, a small French computer company. PAF was similar to FORTRAN. It ran on a drum computer, the CAB500. The title is French for Automatic Programming of Formulae.

External links
 Programmation Automatique des Formules

Information technology companies of France
Programming languages created in 1957